Lectionary 176, designated by siglum ℓ 176 (in the Gregory-Aland numbering) is a Greek manuscript of the New Testament, on parchment. Palaeographically it has been assigned to the 12th century. 
Formerly it was labelled as Lectionary 79a (Scrivener), 
77a (Gregory).

Description 

The codex contains Lessons from the Acts, Catholic, and Pauline epistles lectionary (Apostolarion), on 96 parchment leaves (25.5 by 20.8 cm), with lacunae (six leaves). The text is written in Greek minuscule letters, in one column per page, 18 lines per page.

History 

The manuscript was bought from F. S. Ellis, 10 February 1870. It was examined by Fenton Hort. Gregory saw the manuscript in 1883.

The manuscript is not cited in the critical editions of the Greek New Testament (UBS3).

Currently the codex is located in the Cambridge University Library, (Add. Mss. 679.1) at Cambridge.

See also 

 List of New Testament lectionaries
 Biblical manuscript
 Textual criticism
 Lectionary 305

Notes and references

Bibliography 

 

Greek New Testament lectionaries
12th-century biblical manuscripts
Manuscripts in Cambridge